Jennifer Michelle Harris is an academic, who studies United States foreign policy and economics.

Early life 
Harris' father is Ken Harris, a former Comanche county special district judge and her mother is Karen N. (new Youngblood), a former staff lawyer and former political science professor at Cameron University.

Education 
Harris has a BA degree in economics and international relations from Wake Forest University in Winston-Salem, North Carolina. Harris has a master's degree in Philosophy from Oxford University. Harris was a Harry S. Truman Scholarship recipient and a Rhodes Scholar.
Harris has a JD from Yale Law School.

Career 
Harris started her career as a staff serving the U.S. National Intelligence Council with emphasis in economics and financial issues.

Harris was a senior fellow at the Council on Foreign Relations (CFR). Prior to joining CFR, Harris was a member of the policy planning staff at the U.S. Department of State responsible for global markets, geo-economic issues and energy security. In that role, Harris was a lead architect of Secretary of State Hillary Clinton's Economic Statecraft agenda, which launched in 2011.

In 2018, Harris became a Senior Fellow in Special Projects at William and Flora Hewlett Foundation.
As of 2018, Harris is also a nonresident senior fellow in Foreign Policy at Brookings Institution.

Harris' work has appeared in the New York Times, Foreign Affairs, the Washington Quarterly, and the World Economic Forum among other outlets.

Harris is the co-author of War By Other Means: Geoeconomics and Statecraft.

Personal life 
On August 27, 2016, Harris married Alexander Jacob Post (aka Sasha) in California.

Publications

References

External links 
 List of articles by Jennifer M. Harris at Foreignaffairs.com
 Writing New Rules for the U.S.-China Investment Relationships. Report by Harris at CFR.org

American Rhodes Scholars
Brookings Institution people
Geopoliticians
Living people
Year of birth missing (living people)
21st-century American women writers